The Fighting Generation is a 1944 propaganda short film or public service announcement produced for the U.S. Treasury Department and intended to boost war bond sales, directed by an uncredited Alfred Hitchcock and starring Jennifer Jones as a nurse's aide.

The film was shot in a single day, on October 9, 1944. Rhonda Fleming and actors Steve Dunhill and Tony Devlin were to appear in the scene, according to a call sheet, but in the end, only Jones appears on-screen.

The film survives in the Academy Film Archive and was preserved in 2008. The film is part of the Academy War Film Collection, one of the largest collections of World War II-era short films held outside government archives.

References

External links

A copy of the restored film.

American World War II propaganda shorts
American black-and-white films
Films directed by Alfred Hitchcock
World War II films made in wartime
American war drama films
1940s war drama films
1944 drama films
1944 films
1940s English-language films